India competed at the 2015 World Championships in Athletics from August 22 to August 30 in China, Beijing.

Results

(q – qualified, NM – no mark, SB – season best)

Men

Track and road events

Field events

Women

Track and road events

Nations at the 2015 World Championships in Athletics
World Championships in Athletics
2015